The Pasărea is a left tributary of the river Dâmbovița in Romania. It discharges into the Dâmbovița in Fundeni.

References

Rivers of Romania
Rivers of Ilfov County
Rivers of Călărași County